Dennis Walter Hickey (October 28, 1914 – October 6, 1999) was a Bishop of the Catholic Church in the United States. He served as an auxiliary bishop of the Diocese of Rochester from 1968 to 1990.

Biography
Born in Dansville, New York, Dennis Hickey was ordained a priest for the Diocese of Rochester on June 7, 1941, by Bishop James E. Kearney.

On January 5, 1968 Pope Paul VI appointed him as the Titular Bishop of Rusuccuru and Auxiliary Bishop of Rochester.  He was consecrated bishop by Archbishop Luigi Raimondi, the Apostolic Delegate to the United States, on March 14, 1968. The principal co-consecrators were Rochester Bishop Fulton J. Sheen and Bishop Emeritus James E. Kearney.

Hickey served as an auxiliary bishop until his resignation was accepted by Pope John Paul II on January 16, 1990.  He died on October 6, 1999, at the age of 84.

References

1914 births
1999 deaths
People from Dansville, New York
Roman Catholic Diocese of Rochester
20th-century American Roman Catholic titular bishops
Religious leaders from New York (state)
Catholics from New York (state)